Legionville is an unincorporated community in Crow Wing County, Minnesota, United States, near Brainerd.

References

Unincorporated communities in Crow Wing County, Minnesota
Unincorporated communities in Minnesota